The West Midlands Police and Crime Commissioner is the police and crime commissioner of the West Midlands Police.

The Commissioner's official office is in Lloyd House, the West Midlands Police's headquarters, in Birmingham.

List of West Midlands Police and Crime Commissioners

Election results

2012

2014

2016

2021

References

External links 
 

Police and crime commissioners in England